Peter Lindbäck (born 14 June 1955, Helsinki) is the governor of Åland.

He was born in 1955 and studied at the University of Helsinki, from which he graduated in law in 1981.

Lindbäck was appointed governor of Åland on 5 March 1999 when his predecessor Henrik Gustafsson retired.

See also
 Åland
 Government of Åland
 Provincial Governors of Finland

References

Politicians from Åland
Finnish Lutherans
University of Helsinki alumni
1955 births
Living people